Tarreh-e Khezr (also Romanized as Ţorreh-e Khezr and Tare Xezr; also known as Seyneh (Persian: سيهنه), Khezr, Samand) is a village in Shalahi Rural District, in the Central District of Abadan County, Khuzestan Province, Iran. At the 2006 census, its population was 571, in 104 families.

References 

Populated places in Abadan County